Aldo Olivieri (2 October 1910 – 5 April 2001) was an Italian football goalkeeper from 1931 to 1943, and manager after World War II.

Club career
Olivieri was born in San Michele Extra, Verona.He played for Hellas Verona, Lucchese, and Brescia in Serie B, and Torino in Serie A.

International career
With the Italy national football team, Olivieri became World Champion in 1938.

Style of play
A courageous, spectacular, and athletic shot-stopper, with an excellent spring, Olivieri is regarded as one of Italy's greatest ever goalkeepers; throughout his career, he was known in particular for his quick reflexes, intelligence, and ability to rush off his line and anticipate opposing forwards outside of his area, which earned him the nickname il Gatto Magico ("the Magic Cat"). He also excelled at coming out to punch the ball away.

Death
He died in Lido di Camaiore at 90 years old. He was the penultimate survivor of the 1938 winning team squad. The last member, who died on 5 November 2006, was defender Pietro Rava.

Honours

International
Italy
FIFA World Cup: 1938

References

1910 births
2001 deaths
Footballers from Verona
Italian footballers
Italy international footballers
Italian football managers
Association football goalkeepers
Torino F.C. players
S.S.D. Lucchese 1905 players
Serie A players
Serie B players
Udinese Calcio managers
Inter Milan managers
Hellas Verona F.C. managers
Juventus F.C. managers
Serie A managers
1938 FIFA World Cup players
FIFA World Cup-winning players
Calcio Padova players
Brescia Calcio players
U.S. Triestina Calcio 1918 managers